Dana Marie Bally (born 4 March 1997) is a Canadian-born Guyanese footballer who plays as a fullback and a winger. She has been a member of the Guyana women's national team.

Club career
In 2017, Bally played for Aurora FC in League1 Ontario. In 2018, she played for Oakville Blue Devils FC. In 2021, she played for ProStars FC in the Reserve Division of League1 Ontario.

International career
Bally capped for Guyana at senior level during the 2016 CONCACAF Women's Olympic Qualifying Championship.

See also
List of Guyana women's international footballers

References

1997 births
Living people
Citizens of Guyana through descent
Guyanese women's footballers
Women's association football fullbacks
Women's association football wingers
Guyana women's international footballers
Canadian women's soccer players
McMaster University alumni
Canadian sportspeople of Guyanese descent
Aurora FC (Canada) players
Blue Devils FC (women) players
ProStars FC players